Nassfeld or Naßfeld is a town and ski resort in the district Hermagor of the Austrian state of Carinthia.

It is located below the Nassfeld Pass. Lake Pressegg is nearby, where it is possible to swim in summer and ice skate in the winter.

Ski resort 

Nassfeld is a popular sport destination for winter and summer sports which include skiing, snowboarding, cross-country skiing, mountain hiking and offers more than 1000 km of hiking trails. The area has 30 ski lifts: 5 Gondolas, 5 Six-Seater Chairlifts, 4 four-seater chairlifts and 16 tow lifts. The ski resort has over 220 snow machines for creating artificial snow and 110 km of ski tracks. The cable car called Millennium-Express can lift people to the summit 1919 meters high in less than 15 minutes. The ski resort expands on elevation between 600 and 2000 meters. It has one of Carinthia's longest runs, Carnia, with 7.6 Kilometers in length. weather often differs in these areas but its overall sunny in the summer months and quite a high temperature (5-15 degrees Celsius)

External links

 
 Test review, webcams, snow and weather conditions for Nasseld
 Nassfeld ski resort guide

Ski areas and resorts in Austria
Geography of Carinthia (state)
Sports venues in Carinthia (state)
Cities and towns in Hermagor District